Oeonistis bistrigata is a moth of the family Erebidae. It was described by Rothschild in 1912. It is found in Papua New Guinea.

References

Moths described in 1912
Lithosiina